The Ordnance RML 7-pounder Mk IV "Steel Gun" was a British rifled muzzle-loading mountain gun. 7-pounder referred to the approximate weight of the shell it fired.

History 

It was superseded by the RML 2.5-inch Mountain Gun from 1879.

Combat use 
It could be assembled and a round loaded in 20 seconds. Its common shell was considered ineffective.  To give it a high angle capability, a double shell was produced of increased length and containing a larger bursting charge. This was fired with a reduced charge, but the low muzzle velocity did not always arm the fuze, or prevent the over-long projectile from somersaulting. Shell rotation was effected by studs on the body of the shell. Elevation was by quoin or wedge and by screw.

Anglo-Zulu War 1879 
Britain deployed several guns mounted on Colonial (or "Kaffraria") carriages: light field gun type carriages with larger wider-spaced wheels suited for being horse-drawn across long grass. Two of these guns deployed as field guns of the N/5th Brigade, Royal Field Artillery were lost in the disastrous Battle of Isandlwana.

Second Anglo-Afghan War 

An RML 7-pounder Mountain Gun appears to be present in a photograph by John Burke (photographer) from the Second Anglo-Afghan War (November 1878 – September 1880). The war began when Great Britain, fearful of what it saw as growing Russian influence in Afghanistan, invaded the country from British India. The first phase of the war ended in May 1879 with the Treaty of Gandamak, which permitted the Afghans to maintain internal sovereignty but forced them to cede control over their foreign policy to the British. Fighting resumed in September 1879, after an anti-British uprising in Kabul, and finally concluded in September 1880 with the decisive Battle of Kandahar.

First Boer War 1880–1881 
Britain deployed 4 guns mounted on standard small mountain carriages during the war.

War of the Golden Stool 1900 
The West African Frontier Force fielded a number of guns in the War of the Golden Stool, their use being fairly heavily referenced by Willcocks, Armitage and Montanaro in their books on the campaign. Bartlett also references the Central African Regiment having a battery of 7-pounder guns attached to A Company in 1898, with the Central African Regiment taking part in the war.

Second Boer War 1899–1902 

The gun was employed mounted on armoured trains and used by local militia forces early in the war.

It was also employed mounted on normal field carriages with larger wheels which increased mobility in the long grass and allowed it to be towed by horses.

Anglo-Aro War 
Column No. 4 of The British assembled Aro Field Force deployed one 7-pounder gun during the battles in and around Arochukwu.

See also 
 Battle of Laing's Nek
 List of mountain artillery

Surviving examples 

Today, several examples of the guns still exist around the world :
 at the Regional Military Training Center in Darulaman Garrison, Kabul. The garrison is near the palaces, and south of the Bala Hissar where the British had their headquarters during the Anglo-Afghan wars.
 A gun at Royal Armoury, Fort Nelson, UK
 Royal Artillery Museum, London
 South African National Museum of Military History, Johannesburg, South Africa

Notes and references

Bibliography 
 Major Darrell D Hall, "Guns in South Africa 1899-1902" in The South African Military History Society Military History Journal – Vol 2 No 1, June 1971
 Major Darrell D. Hall, "Field Artillery of the British Army 1860–1960. Part I, 1860 – 1900" in The South African Military History Society. Military History Journal – Vol 2 No 4, December 1972 (web page is incorrectly titled 1900–1914)
 W. L. Ruffell, The Gun – Rifled Ordnance: Mountain Artillery. RML 7-pounder

Further reading 
 Major D.D. Hall, The South African Military History Society Military History Journal Vol 4 No 4, December 1978. "ARTILLERY IN THE ZULU WAR – 1879"
 Major D.D. Hall, The South African Military History Society Military History Journal – Vol 5 No 2, December 1980. "The Artillery of the First Anglo-Boer War 1880 – 1881"
 MAJOR G. TYLDEN, ED, The South African Military History Society Military History Journal – Vol 1 No 2, June 1968. Further Notes on Early Rhodesian Military Units and Early Rhodesia's Weapons

External links 

 Diagram of carriage, 7-pounder gun of 200 Lbs Mk I and Text at Victorian Forts and Artillery website.

Mountain artillery
Artillery of the United Kingdom
76 mm artillery
Victorian-era weapons of the United Kingdom